ADS were a small assembler of 98cc autocycles using Sachs and Ilo engines.

References

Motorcycle manufacturers of Belgium